The following is a list of episodes for the British sitcom 'Allo 'Allo! that aired from 1982 to 1992. Following the Pilot in 1982, the series was officially launched two years later in 1984 (Series 1) and continued to Series 9 (1992); including two Christmas Special episodes in 1985 (between Series 2 and 3) and in 1991 (between Series 7 and 8).  The last series (Series 9) was followed by two retrospective episodes in 1994 (The Best of 'Allo 'Allo!) & 2007 (The Return of 'Allo 'Allo!).  In total, including the Pilot, the two Christmas Specials and the two post series retrospective episodes; there are 87 episodes. Dates shown are original air dates on BBC One (except for The Return of 'Allo 'Allo! episode which was broadcast on BBC Two).

Overview

Episodes

Pilot (1982)

 Produced by David Croft

Series 1 (1984)

Series 2 (1985)

Series 3 (1986–87)

Series 4 (1987)

Series 5 (1988–89)

Series 6 (1989)

Series 7 (1991)

Series 8 (1991–92)

Series 9 (1992)

Specials

The Best of 'Allo 'Allo! (1994)

The Return of 'Allo 'Allo! (2007)

Notes
There remains some confusion over what the official titles are for each 'Allo 'Allo! episode (there were no onscreen titles for any episodes on the original transmission, though many episodes have had such titles added for repeat screenings and DVD releases, nor in Radio Times, though again the magazine has listed titles for some repeats). 
This had led to different DVD releases using different titles; and some fans have formed their own unofficial titles for episodes which have not yet been released on DVD. For the purposes of clarification, titles shown here are as follows:
 Series 1-7: These are the titles which appear on the British Region 2 DVD releases. Titles shown in brackets are where Region 1 and Region 4 DVD release titles do not correspond to those on the British Region 2 DVD release.
 Series 8-9: These are the titles which appear on the American Region 1 DVD releases. Series 8-9 and the second Christmas Special (under the title "Pregnancy") have been released on DVD in Poland, however with no titles, just notes on every episode.

References

External links
 
 

List of Allo Allo episodes
Allo Allo episodes, List of